Tongass may refer to:

 Fort Tongass
 Tongass people, or Taantʼa Ḵwáan, "Sea Lion Tribe", one of the main divisions of the Tlingit people and the namesake of all other "Tongass" names.
 Tongass Highway
 Tongass Island
 Tongass Narrows, a channel by Ketchikian, Alaska, which forms part of the Alaska Marine Highway
 Tongass National Forest
 Tongass Passage, a strait on the Canada-United States border